The Umariya Elementary School is a madrassa in the Muslim Quarter of Jerusalem's Old City. It is located at the start of the Via Dolorosa, where it marks the First Station of the Cross, and is adjacent to the Convent of the Sisters of Zion. Underneath the buildings of the school are remains of the Antonia Fortress.

In 1996, under the orders of the then prime minister, Benjamin Netanyahu, an exit from the Western Wall Tunnel was opened into the Via Dolorosa underneath the school (specifically, under the school's entrance stairs). This was interpreted by some in the Arab population as a land-grab, and over the subsequent week, 80 people were killed as a result of riots against the creation of the exit.

Former students at the school include Abu Nidal, the founder of a militant Fatah breakaway organization.

Environs 

To its south is the part of the northern wall of the al-Aqsa Compound that includes al-Muḥdathiyya (al-Maḥdithiyya), al-Jawiliyya and aṣ-Ṣabībiyya (aṣ-Ṣubaybiyya) Madrasas. 

To its southeast is the part of the wall with the Gate of the Bani Ghānim.

See also 
Struthion Pool

References 

Schools in the West Bank
Schools in Jerusalem
Primary schools in the State of Palestine